Live Twice, Love Once is a 2019 Spanish tragic comedy film directed by María Ripoll.

A poignant tragic comedy about family, love, ageing, Alzheimer's and dementia. A successful Spanish mathematics professor faces the awful reality of Alzheimer's and increasingly reverts to earlier memories of a lost love. With hesitant but increasing support from his somewhat dysfunctional family, the professor pursues a childhood dream before losing all his memory, forging stronger family ties long the way.

Release 
The film premiered in Madrid on 6 September 2019.

Reception 

Awards and nominations 

|-
| align = "center" rowspan = "12" | 2019 || rowspan = "12" | 2nd Valencian Audiovisual Awards || colspan = "2" | Best Film ||  || rowspan = "12" | 
|-
| Best Actress || Inma Cuesta || 
|-
| Best Actor || Óscar Martínez || 
|-
| Best Supporting Actress || Mafalda Carbonell || 
|-
| Best Supporting Actor || Nacho López || 
|-
| Best Screenplay || María Minguez Pardo || 
|-
| Best Original Score || Arnau Bataller, Simón Smith || 
|-
| Best Sound || Carlos Lidón || 
|-
| Best Makeup and Hairstyles || Esther Guillem, Marta Arce || 
|-
| Best Costume Design || Cristina Rodríguez || 
|-
| Best Cinematography || Nuria Roldós || 
|-
| Best Production Supervision || Christian Guijarro, Lorena Lluch || 
|}

See also 
 List of Spanish films of 2019

References

External links 

2019 comedy films
2019 comedy-drama films
2019 films
2010s Spanish-language films
Spanish comedy films
Spanish comedy-drama films
Films set in Valencia
2010s Spanish films
Films about Alzheimer's disease